Arcas is a genus of butterflies in the family Lycaenidae. The species of this genus are found in the Neotropical realm.

The genus was erected by William John Swainson in 1832. The sister genus of Arcas is Theritas.

Species
 Arcas alleluia Bálint, 2002
 Arcas arcadia Bálint, 2002
 Arcas cypria (Geyer, 1837)
 Arcas delphia Nicolay, 1971 - Costa Rica and Colombia
 Arcas ducalis (Westwood, 1852) - Brazil
 Arcas gozmanyi Bálint, 2006
 Arcas imperialis (Cramer, 1775) -Mexico, Colombia, Bolivia,  Peru,  Ecuador, Guyana and Brazil
 Arcas jivaro Nicolay, 1971 - Ecuador and Peru
 Arcas nicolayi Salazar Escobar & Constantino, 1995
 Arcas splendor (Druce, 1907)
 Arcas tuneta (Hewitson, 1865) - Brazil two forms

References
Bálint, Zs., 2006 Arcas Swainson, 1832 is revisited: review of some species-group names, identification of the sister group and a key for species (Lepidoptera, Lycaenidae: Eumaeini) Annales historico-naturales Musei nationalis hungarici 98 :147-158.

External links
"Arcas Swainson, 1832" at Markku Savela's Lepidoptera and Some Other Life Forms

Eumaeini
Lycaenidae of South America
Lycaenidae genera
Taxa named by William John Swainson